Ice Cold is the debut studio album of Canadian rapper Choclair, released November 2, 1999 in Canada and March 14, 2000 in the United States. It was released on major label Virgin/Priority Records. The album's early success was driven by the first single, "Let's Ride", which reached #37 on the Billboard Hot Rap Singles chart and #38 on the Canadian RPM Singles Chart. The second single, "Rubbin'", features Saukrates.

Reception

In Canada, the album debuted at #10 on the Canadian Albums Chart and went gold in 35 days, eventually selling over 63,000 copies. It received generally favorable reviews from music critics. AllMusic gave the album 4 out of 5 stars, noting that Choclair used it "not only to display his own lyrical credentials, but to showcase the wealth of untapped talent our neighbors to the north have to offer." The Source gave it 3 out of 5 mics, praising the production, "the beats...give this album some of the most original sounds in hip-hop today." The album won the award for Best Rap Recording at the 2000 Juno Awards.

Track listing

The 1999 Canadian release does not include "First Thing". Instead, there is a radio version of "Rollin'".

Samples
"Bare Witness" – Contains a sample of "DWYCK" by Gang Starr

Chart positions

Release history

References

1999 debut albums
Albums produced by K-Cut (producer)
Albums produced by Kardinal Offishall
Albums produced by Saukrates
Choclair albums
Priority Records albums
Virgin Records albums
Juno Award for Rap Recording of the Year recordings